"She's Got to Be a Saint" is a 1972 single by Ray Price.  "She's Got to Be a Saint" was Ray Price's seventh number one on the country chart.  The single stayed a number one for three weeks and spent a total of fourteen weeks on the country chart.

Chart performance

References
 

1972 singles
Ray Price (musician) songs
1972 songs
Columbia Records singles
Song recordings produced by Don Law